The National Liberation Movement of Ahwaz (abbreviated NLMA) is an Arab nationalist and separatist organisation whose goal is to establish an independent state called Ahwaz in Iran.

See also
 Arab Struggle Movement for the Liberation of Ahvaz
 Democratic Revolutionary Front for the Liberation of Arabistan
 Ahvaz National Resistance

References

External links

Arab nationalism in Iran
Arab nationalist militant groups
Iran–Iraq relations
Khuzestan conflict
Militant opposition to the Islamic Republic of Iran
Nasserist organizations
National liberation armies
Organisations designated as terrorist by Iran